Norberto's Deadline is a 2010 opera prima and tells the story of Norberto. Fired from his job, Norberto tries his luck as a real estate agent, putting off telling his wife. His new boss recommends that he attend a personal assertiveness course to overcome his timidity and he starts studying acting at a beginners’ workshop. While preparing the 3-monthly show, while he fails in his endeavours to behave credibly towards his clients and his wife, what he does discover is a tremendous ability to lie to himself.

Description 
Uruguayan actor Daniel Hendler makes his feature filmmaking debut with this portrayal of Norberto (Fernando Amaral), a dissatisfied man who discovers a zest for acting and the theatre. Set in Hendler’s hometown of Montevideo, the film follows Norberto as his life is renewed by the discovery of an unknown talent.

Recently fired from his job at an airline, Norberto tries his hand at real estate. When the new boss criticizes his timidity and recommends that he attend a course in personal affirmation, Norberto opts for a theatre class instead and immediately discovers a passion for it. But he hides it from his wife and even begins lying to his peers. His attitude continues to harden until his wife leaves him. With his new-found liberty, this complex man must find a way to move forward.

Amaral’s performance as Norberto is both real and precise. Even better, his comedic timing is impeccable. In one hilarious sequence Norberto attempts to close the deal on an apartment occupied by an elderly couple who have become a nuisance to their children. When he shows the place to potential tenants, he must constantly shoo the old folks into the kitchen to hide. It’s Amaral’s charisma that imbues what could have been a cruel moment with endearing warmth and sensitivity.

Hendler knows the habits and quirks of actors inside out, of course, and brings that authenticity to his story of a man in the process of becoming a performer. A witty and inspiring film about the revelation of embracing one’s creativity, Norberto's Deadline also explores the complications of aspiring to achieve international success in a small country with few resources. Against those very same odds, Hendler has achieved just that. Diana Sanchez

Director 
Daniel Hendler was born in Montevideo, Uruguay and is an actor, writer and director. He has acted in numerous Argentine productions, most notably in the films of Daniel Burman, including Waiting for the Messiah (2000), Every Stewardess Goes to Heaven (2002), Lost Embrace (2004) and Family Law (film) (2006). He also made the short films Perro Perdiddo (co-director, 2002) and Cuarto de Hora (2004). Norberto's Deadline (2010) is his feature writing and directing debut.

Accolades 
The European premiere was in the Locarno International Film Festival, in the section Cineasti del Presente.

The movie won the award Televisión Española, in the section Cine en Construcción. It also participated in the 58th Edition 2010 of the San Sebastián International Film Festival, in the section Horizontes Latinos. San Sebastian (Donostia in Euskera) is traditionally one of the biggest events on the Latin American movie calendar. In addition to the titles screened in the Official Selection and Zabaltegi-New Directors, it brings a specific selection of films from Latin America, unreleased in Spain, and competing for the Horizontes Award, that carries a cash prize of 35.000 euros.

The North American premiere was in the Toronto International Film Festival in the Discovey programme, this programme spotlights the most exciting work from new and emerging directors from around the world.

References

External links
 
 Official Website

2010 films
2010 comedy-drama films
Argentine independent films
2010s Spanish-language films
Films set in Montevideo
Uruguayan independent films